La Habana or Havana is the capital of Cuba.

Habana may also refer to:
 Habana, Queensland, a small town in Australia
 Habana (album), a 1997 album by Roy Hargrove's Crisol
 Habana (baseball club), a baseball team in the old Cuban League (1878–1961)
 Habana Formation, a Campanian-to-Maastrichtian geologic formation of Cuba
 "Habana" (song), a 2004 song by Miguel Bosé
 Cyclone Habana, a 2021 tropical cyclone in the South-West Indian ocean